PMQ (formerly, Police Married Quarters) is the historic site of the old Hollywood Road Police Married Quarters, which is now a mixed-use arts and design venue in Hong Kong, between Aberdeen Street, Staunton Street, Hollywood Road, and Shing Wong Street. 

The site occupies what was originally the grounds of Queen's College, which was built on the site in 1889. After damage during World War II, it was repurposed as quarters for married junior policemen. The compound has been listed as a Grade III historic building since 2010. In 2014, after nearly 15 years of disuse, it was renamed PMQ and opened to the public. Its residential units were turned into exhibitions spaces, studios, shops and offices for creative enterprises.

History
The Central Government School was built on Gough Street in 1862 and was the first government primary and secondary school in Hong Kong which provided Western education to the public. In 1889, due to the increasing number of students, the school relocated to a new campus on Hollywood Road. Later on the school was renamed 'Victoria College', then Queen’s College in 1894. At that time, the school was one of the largest and most expensive buildings in Hong Kong. Many local leaders and talent were nurtured at this school, including the Father of Modern China, Dr Sun Yat-sen and business tycoons such as Sir Robert Ho Tung. However, during the Japanese Occupation in 1941, the building was destroyed. In 1948, the remaining building was demolished. In 1951, in order to increase police recruitment in response to the influx of Chinese immigrants after the Chinese Civil War, PMQ provided 140 single room units and 28 double room units for the rank and file officers serving at the nearby Central Police Station. Former Hong Kong Chief Executives C.Y. Leung and Donald Tsang have both lived there. In 2000, the building was emptied. In 2009, the 'Conserving Central' project mentioned in the Policy Address that eight heritage sites in Central including PMQ should be renovated. In April 2014, PMQ started to operate as a creative hub.

Features

The original site area was around 6,000 square meters. After the revitalization, the total floor areas became 18,000 square meters. Because the location is near galleries and boutiques along Hollywood Road and SoHo, it was successful in attracting around 100 design galleries, shops, bookstores and office units. Moreover, there are 15 ‘pop- up’ units for design exhibitions and outlets. The 1,000-square-meter central courtyard has held events like "Panda-mania" in 2014, with 1,600 paper versions of the endangered animal. To promote the historic background of PMQ, a tunnel allows visitors to go through the foundation of the former Victoria College.

Conservation policy

Between 2005 and 2007, the Antiquities and Monuments Office (AMO) investigated the remnants of PMQ. They found the remains of the Central School, including granite shafts and plinths of the boundary walls and the retaining wall; the quoin stones at the corners of the site; and the steps. The AMO rated PMQ as Grade III Historic Building in 2010.

In 2008, the government underwent a public engagement exercise on PMQ. In response, the government based revitalisation plans on six principles: 

Preserve historic relics
Emphasize the cultural and historical value and the original ambience
Give it a new lease of life by gathering creative industries to make it a landmark for local residents and visitors
Contribute to the urban planning along Hollywood Road and the surrounding area on the proposed ‘spot, line and area’ heritage conservation methods
Respond to community concerns about the development density and the building height
Fulfill community expectations of having more public space

Architecture

PMQ consists of two, seven-storey blocks of the former Hollywood
Road Police Married Quarters, named Stauton and Hollywood, and the former Central Junior Police Call Clubhouse. The former clubhouse now houses restaurants. One additional feature, named 'CUBE', was added as the linkage between the two blocks, with a rooftop garden called 'PLATEAU' on the fourth floor.

Some modern designs were deployed, such as a UV-protective glass ceiling. 

Heritage can be found in the main entrance of the quarters. The granite steps and rubble retaining wall, entrance at Staunton Street were from the Central school. Guests can take the free Underground Interpretation Area Walk-in Tour or the PMQ Heritage Interpretation Guided Tour.

Special events
PMQ organizes free arts programs, events and workshops every month. 

One special event is the monthly night market, which is divided into three parts: live band show, product design and food stalls. 

Some international exhibitions are held in PMQ also. Previously, there were an international exhibition called “1600 Pandas” organized by WWF. In order to raise people’s awareness of protecting the environment, the exhibition displayed 1600 paper-made pandas.

See also
Historic police buildings in Hong Kong
Three (2002 film)

References

External links

 Consultancy for Heritage Impact Assessment for Transformation of the Former Police Married Quarters Site on Hollywood Road into a Creative Industries Landmark. Volume 1 - Built Heritage Impact Assessment. Architectural Services Department. March 2011
 Historic Building Appraisal. See Item #N14
 PMQ website

Buildings and structures in Hong Kong
Sheung Wan
Hong Kong Police Force
Government buildings in Hong Kong
Grade III historic buildings in Hong Kong